Krummin is a municipality in the Vorpommern-Greifswald district, in Mecklenburg-Vorpommern, Germany.

References

External links

Official website of Krummin (German)

Vorpommern-Greifswald